The 2013 Tour of Turkey was the 49th edition of the Presidential Cycling Tour of Turkey cycling stage race. It was held from 21 April to 28 April 2013, and was rated as a 2.HC event on the UCI Europe Tour. In early 2014 Turkish Cycling Federation disqualified the original winner Mustafa Sayar and announced Natnael Berhane's victory.

Teams
There were 25 teams participating in the 2013 Tour of Turkey. Among them were 9 UCI ProTeams, 15 UCI Professional Continental teams, and 1 UCI Continental team. Each team were allowed a maximum of eight riders on their squad, giving the event a peloton of 193 cyclists at its outset.

UCI ProTour Teams
 
 
 
 
 
 
 
 
 

UCI Professional Continental Teams
 
 
 
 
 
 
 
 
 
 
 
 
 
 
 

UCI Continental Teams

Stages

Stage 1
21 April 2013 – Alanya to Alanya,

Stage 2
22 April 2013 – Alanya to Antalya,

Stage 3
23 April 2013 – Antalya to Elmalı,

Stage 4
24 April 2013 – Göcek to Marmaris,

Stage 5
25 April 2013 – Marmaris to Bodrum,

Stage 6
26 April 2013 – Bodrum to Selçuk,

Stage 7
27 April 2013 – Kuşadası to Izmir,

Stage 8
28 April 2013 – Istanbul,

Classification leadership

References

External links

Tour of Turkey
Tour of Turkey
Presidential Cycling Tour of Turkey by year